Wakayama Prefecture held a gubernatorial election in November 2018. Incumbent Yoshinobu Nisaka was reelected for a fourth term.

References

2018 elections in Japan
Wakayama gubernatorial elections
November 2018 events in Japan